James White was a rugby union player who played for the Springboks. Born in Queenstown, he was educated at Queen's College where he played for the school's 1st XV Rugby team.

Biography
At the age of 20 in 1931, he was called up to play for the Springboks making him the 217th Springbok and the 2nd of his school to play for the Springboks. He played his first test match on December 5, against  at St. Helens, Swansea where they won the match 8–3. He played and started on all his 10 test matches and has a total of 10 points (2 tries and a drop goal). His last match for South Africa was on September 4, 1937 against  at Lancaster Park, Christchurch where they won the match 13–6.

Following his career White served in the Second World War as a member of the 6th Armoured Division.

He died on July 3, 1997 at Johannesburg aged 86.

Test history 

Legend: try (3 pts); pen = penalty (3 pts.); conv = conversion (2 pts.), drop = drop kick (4 pts.).

See also
List of South Africa national rugby union players – Springbok no. 217

References

External links
Jimmy White international stats

1911 births
1997 deaths
People from Queenstown, South Africa
South African rugby union players
Rugby union centres
South Africa international rugby union players
Rugby union players from the Eastern Cape
Border Bulldogs players
Alumni of Queen's College Boys' High School